John Joe Patrick Finn Benoa (born 24 September 2003), known as John Patrick, is a professional footballer who plays as a midfielder for Spanish club Getafe CF B. Born in Spain, he has represented the Republic of Ireland at under-19 level.

Club career
John Patrick joined Real Madrid's La Fábrica in 2012, at the age of nine. He subsequently represented CD Canillas, Alcobendas CF and Getafe CF as a youth, having joined the latter side in 2018.

On 5 December 2020, before even appearing with the reserves, John Patrick made his professional – and La Liga – debut by coming on as a late substitute for Ángel in a 0–3 away loss against Levante UD; aged 17 years and 42 days, he became the youngest debutant in Getafe's history.

International career
John Patrick was born in Madrid to an Irish father from Ballyhaunis, County Mayo, and a French-Cameroonian mother. He can represent Ireland, Spain, France or Cameroon internationally.

In March 2021, it was confirmed by Republic of Ireland U21 manager Jim Crawford, that John has chosen to represent the Republic of Ireland saying, “He certainly wants to play for the Republic of Ireland”. On 4 October 2021, he was called up to the Republic of Ireland U19 squad for the first time, for their double header of friendlies against Sweden U19 in Marbella, Spain. He made his underage international debut on 8 October 2021 in a 2–2 draw with Sweden.

Career statistics

References

External links
Getafe profile 

2003 births
Living people
Footballers from Madrid
Spanish footballers
Association football midfielders
CD Canillas players
Getafe CF footballers
La Liga players
Irish people of Spanish descent
Irish people of Cameroonian descent
Irish sportspeople of African descent
Irish people of French descent
Spanish people of Irish descent
Spanish people of Cameroonian descent
Spanish sportspeople of African descent
Spanish people of French descent
Black Irish sportspeople
Republic of Ireland expatriate association footballers
Republic of Ireland association footballers
Republic of Ireland youth international footballers